Komar is a village in the municipality of Travnik, Bosnia and Herzegovina.

Demographics 
According to the 2013 census, its population was nil, down from 311 (mainly Serbs) in 1991.

References

Populated places in Travnik